Space Cabbie (also spelled Space Cabby) is a science fiction character in DC Comics.

Publication history
Space Cabbie first appeared in Mystery in Space #21 (August 1954) in a story scripted by Otto Binder and drawn by Howard Sherman. The character reappeared in issue #24, in the story "The Hitchhiker of Space", written by France Herron and again drawn by Sherman, and thereafter became a recurring series in Mystery in Space, the only such in the book for the whole time that the series was being first printed. Besides Binder, Gardner Fox would write many appearances, and artwork was handled by Gil Kane and Bernard Sachs. The Cabbie's monthly series continued to 1958 with Mystery in Space #47; the character's last appearance as a lead feature would be in August 1972 in From Beyond the Unknown #18, a reprint of "The Hitchhiker of Space". His last solo appearance in a comic book was in DC Super Stars #6 which was published in August 1976. It was a reprint of a story called "The Luxury Limousine of Space". Otto Binder wrote that story as well.

Space Cabbie has since then made occasional guest appearances in other comics, such as Starman, and DC Comics Presents #78. He was mentioned in one issue of the "New 52" series Threshold, about a bounty/game in space, and later made several appearances in the series Hal Jordan and the Green Lantern Corps as an underworld informant of the Green Lantern Guy Gardner.

Fictional character biography
Space Cabbie lives in the mid 22nd century, driving for 9-Planet Taxi. As a child, he grew up among the military tyrants of Ghengkis VII. He showed an aptitude for stellar navigation. During the 'Bored Wars' of 2146, he was a fighter pilot. He took jobs as a laborer and a pilot for hire. He eventually took up driving cab #7433. He is a member of the 'Cosmic Order Of Space Cab Pilots' and 'Veterans Of Alien Wars'.

His first appearance is as a narrator, telling tales to his fares. Over the next handful of issues, he has his cab stolen, meets his exact double and has to deal with a mail bomb. His adventures dominate the title Mystery in Space. The series ends with #47, where he has to deal with three doubles.

He is seen conversing about space exploration to a friend. He is briefly seen in the round-robin Challenge limited series.

At one point, he and his cab are co-opted by Lobo to chase down a gang of space bikers. Lobo leaves Space Cabbie, who is charged with reckless driving, murder, and other crimes. On the way to prison, Lobo saves him and returns his cab. The discrepancy of a modern-age character appearing with a 'future' one is explained when Space Cabbie mentions on the witness stand that he took a day job in the present to help make ends meet.

Space Cabbie plays host to two passengers talking about the legacy of 'Starman', a name given to multiple heroes over many decades.

He has a brief cameo when Timothy Hunter takes a magical trip into the future. He makes another cameo in the time-torn plot of JLA: The Nail.

He assists Superman, who is ill, across the time stream itself. Both come under weapons fire.

He gains a reputation for being able to take anyone anywhere in the universe.

An older version with an artificial leg is seen assisting the Green Lantern Corps with vital intelligence information. Space Cabbie is back work doing fares into forbidden areas.

Kyle Rayner later works with the Cabbie who has upgraded with a Mother Box engine. This allows faster and farther fares.

Other appearances
 Space Cabbie appears in Justice League Unlimited #18 (April 2006) and Ambush Bug: Year None #1 (September 2008).
 Space Cabbie's cab made a brief appearance in Elseworlds' JLA: Another Nail when all time periods meld together.
 Space Cabbie makes a cameo in the final issue of Batman: The Brave and the Bold as Bat-Mite is upset at the comic's cancellation and states several missed crossover opportunities including Space Cabbie.

In other media

Television
 Space Cabbie appears inof Justice League Action, voiced by Patton Oswalt. This version exists in the present and keeps photos of himself and other important people that he has transported in one of his visors.
 Space Cabbie makes a cameo appearance in the Harley Quinn episode "The Runaway Bridesmaid", receiving a key to the city from Gotham's mayor for his role in saving the city alongside the Justice League.

References

External links
 Space Cabby at Don Markstein's Toonopedia. Archived from the original on February 12, 2016.
 DCU Guide: Space cabbie

Comics characters introduced in 1954
Fictional taxi drivers
Characters created by Otto Binder
Science fiction characters
DC Comics male characters
Fictional people from the 22nd-century